Diadelia bispinosa is a species of beetle in the family Cerambycidae. It was described by Breuning in 1939.

References

Diadelia
Beetles described in 1939
Taxa named by Stephan von Breuning (entomologist)